Roberto Zywica (born 21 January 1947 in Buenos Aires) is an Argentine former football midfielder and manager.

Playing career
Zywica started his professional playing career in 1966 with CA River Plate. He joined Gimnasia La Plata where he was part of "La Barredora" team.

In 1971, he joined Stade de Reims alongside teammate Delio Onnis, where he played three seasons and was nicknamed "Roberto Z". He enjoyed three more seasons in France, with Troyes, Toulouse and GFCO Ajaccio.

He ended his career in Argentina with stints with All Boys, Nueva Chicago, Banfield and Atlanta.

Managerial career
He has managed Belgrano and Tristán Suárez in 1993–94.

References

External links
 Roberto Zywica at BDFA.com.ar 
  Le salut de Roberto Z..., les anciens du Stade de Reims 

1947 births
Living people
Footballers from Buenos Aires
Argentine footballers
Argentine people of Polish-Jewish descent
Argentina international footballers
Argentine expatriate footballers
Association football midfielders
Argentine Primera División players
Club Atlético River Plate footballers
Club de Gimnasia y Esgrima La Plata footballers
Stade de Reims players
ES Troyes AC players
Toulouse FC players
Expatriate footballers in France
Argentine expatriate sportspeople in France
Ligue 1 players
Ligue 2 players
All Boys footballers
Nueva Chicago footballers
Club Atlético Banfield footballers
Club Atlético Atlanta footballers
Argentine football managers
Club Atlético Belgrano managers
Argentine Jews
Jewish Argentine sportspeople